Almonaster la Real is a town and municipality located in the province of Huelva, Spain. According to the 2005 census, the city had a population of 1,805 inhabitants.

Demographics

Monuments

Mosque, 9th-10th century

As the Arab name Al-Munastir suggests, the Mosque was built on the site of a Christian monastery and incorporates some of the fabric of a visigothic basilica. It is one of the few surviving Spanish rural mosques of Umayyad date (10th century, possibly 9th).

It is an oddly-shaped building, made of brick and stone in a trapezoidal shape, probably because of the hilly terrain.

The prayer hall consists of a central nave and aisles divided by brick arcades, resting on rectangular stone pillars or reused Roman columns, with at least one re-employed Roman Corinthian capital. The central nave is wider than the two adjacent aisles, which are in turn wider than the outer aisles.  The brick Mihrab projects into the southern flank. A small courtyard was cut out of the rock in the north-east corner, and contains a stone basin that was once used for ritual ablutions. The detached rectangular minaret on the north side has been converted into a bell tower. The eastern apse and sacristy and western porch were also added when the building was turned into a church. Sixteen undated graves were found under the floor.

What little light it would have had would have come in via the patio, the door and three narrow windows, two to the left of the Mihrab and two to the right.

References

External links

Almonaster la Real - Sistema de Información Multiterritorial de Andalucía

Municipalities in the Province of Huelva